Ferdinand Raphaël Bischoffsheim (2 August 1837 – 4 November 1909) was a Belgian banker and politician.

He joined Bischoffsheim, Goldschmidt & Cie, a bank co-founded by his father, Jonathan-Raphaël Bischoffsheim. It would eventually merge to Banque de Crédit et de Dépôt des Pays-Bas in 1863.

Bischoffsheim also was a member of the Belgian parliament.

References

1837 births
1909 deaths
Belgian bankers
Belgian people of German-Jewish descent
Jewish Belgian politicians
Jewish bankers
Politicians from Brussels